Craig Izzard (born 20 July 1964) is an Australian former professional rugby league footballer who played in the 1980s and 1990s. He also had a short stint at the Leeds club in England in 1989.

Playing career
Moved to Parramatta after his lack of opportunities with Penrith where he won the clubman of the year award in 1989 before finding it difficult again to hold down a regular first grade spot he moved to the Illawarra Steelers transforming himself into a tireless .

Post playing
In 2004, Izzard become manager of the New South Wales Residents rugby league side.

In 2017, he was found corrupt by the Independent Commission Against Corruption for agreeing to accept bribes in exchange for not investigating unlawful asbestos dumping during his employment as an anti-dumping investigator.

A former investigator with the Western Sydney Regional Illegal Dumping Squad (RIDS), was found to have engaged in "serious corrupt conduct" by the commission on Tuesday. The matter was then referred to the Director of Public Prosecutions for the consideration of criminal charges.

He also featured in an ABC Four Corners investigation Trashed: The dirty truth about your rubbish, by Caro Meldrum-Hanna which went to air 7 August 2017.

References

External links
Craig Izzard Player profile
Craig Izzard scoring record

1964 births
Living people
Australian rugby league players
Balmain Tigers players
Blacktown Workers players
Illawarra Steelers players
Leeds Rhinos players
Parramatta Eels players
Penrith Panthers players
Rugby league locks
Rugby league players from Penrith, New South Wales
Rugby league second-rows